Sayuti (born June 30, 1980) is an Indonesian footballer who currently plays for PSAP Sigli in the Indonesia Super League.

Club statistics

References

External links

1980 births
Association football forwards
Living people
Indonesian footballers
Liga 1 (Indonesia) players
PSAP Sigli players
Indonesian Premier Division players